African empires is an umbrella term used in African studies to refer to a number of pre-colonial African kingdoms in Africa with multinational structures incorporating various populations and polities into a single entity, usually through conquest.

Listed below are known African empires and their respective capital cities.

The Wabongo kingdom, with its capital in Bokanga, in the Lobaye region (South West Central African Republic)

Historical development

Sahelian kingdoms

The Sahelian kingdoms were a series of medieval empires centred on the Sahel, the area of grasslands south of the Sahara.

 The first major state to rise in this region was the Ghana Empire (Wagadu).  The name Ghana, often used by historians, was the regnal title given to the ruler of the Wagadu empire.  Centered in what is today Senegal and Mauritania, it was the first to benefit from the introduction of gold mining.  Ghana dominated the region between about 750 and 1078.  Smaller states in the region at this time included Takrur to the west, the Malinke kingdom of Mali to the south, and the Songhai Empire  centred on Gao to the east.
 When Ghana collapsed in the face of invasion from the Almoravids, a series of brief kingdoms followed, notably that of the Sosso (Susu); after 1235, the Mali Empire rose to dominate the region.  Located on the Niger River to the west of Ghana in what is today Niger and Mali, it reached its peak in the 1350s, but had lost control of a number of vassal states by 1400.
 The most powerful of these states was the Songhai Empire, which expanded rapidly beginning with king Sonni Ali in the 1460s. By 1500, it had risen to stretch from Cameroon to the Maghreb, the largest state in African history.  It too was quite short-lived and collapsed in 1591 as a result of Moroccan musketry.
 Far to the east, on Lake Chad, the state of Kanem-Bornu, founded as Kanem in the 9th century, now rose to greater preeminence in the central Sahel region. To their west, the loosely united Hausa city-states became dominant.  These two states coexisted uneasily, but were quite stable.
 In 1810, the Sokoto Caliphate rose and conquered the Hausa, creating a more centralized state.  It and Kanem-Bornu would continue to exist until the arrival of Europeans, when both states would fall and the region would be divided between France and Great Britain.
 The  Jolof Empire ruled parts of Senegal from 1350 to 1549. After 1549, its vassal states were fully or de facto independent; in this period it is known as the Jolof Kingdom. It was largely conquered by the imamate of Futa Jallon in 1875 and its territories fully incorporated into French West Africa by 1890.

Empires of 15th–19th century Africa
From the 15th century until the final Scramble for Africa in the late 19th century a number of empires were also established south of the Sahel, especially in West Africa.

West Africa

The West African empires of this period peaked in power in the late 18th century, paralleling the peak of the Atlantic slave trade. These empires implemented a culture of permanent warfare in order to generate the required numbers of captives required to satisfy the demand for slaves by the European colonies.  With the gradual abolition of slavery in the European colonial empires during the 19th century, slave trade again became less lucrative and the West African empires entered a period of decline, and mostly collapsed by the end of the 19th century.

 The Kingdom of Dagbon was founded by Naa Gbewaa circa 11th Century. The Kingdom is one of the largest and oldest in modern Ghana. This kingdom spanned across Northern Ghana, North East Ivory Coast, Southern Burkina Faso and North West Togo. It is the progenitor of the Mossi Kingdoms of Burkina Faso founded by Yennega, the Bouna of Ivory Coast and the Dagaaba states. The kingdom is known for its fierce resistance to slavery. 
 The Kingdom of Nri was unusual in the history of world government in that its leader exercised no military power over his subjects. The kingdom existed as a sphere of religious and political influence over much of Igboland, and was administered by a priest-king called the eze Nri. The eze Nri managed trade and diplomacy on behalf of the Igbo people, and was the possessor of divine authority in religious matters.
 The Oyo Empire (1400–1895) was a West African empire of what is today western Nigeria. The empire was established by the Yoruba in the 15th century and grew to become one of the largest West African states. It rose to prominence through wealth gained from trade and its possession of a powerful cavalry. The Oyo Empire was the most politically important state in the region from the mid-17th to the late 18th century, holding sway not only over other Yoruba states, but also over the Fon kingdom of Dahomey (located in the state now known as the Republic of Benin).
 Benin Empire (1240–1897), a pre-colonial African empire of modern Nigeria, Ancient Benin Empire was one of the oldest and most highly developed states in the coastal hinterland of West Africa, The empire offers a snapshot of a relatively well-organized and sophisticated African polity in operation before the major European colonial interlude.
 Kaabu Empire (1537–1867), a Mandinka Kingdom of Senegambia (centered on modern northeastern Guinea-Bissau but extending into Casamance, Senegal) that rose to prominence in the region thanks to its origins as a former province of the Mali Empire. After the decline of the Mali Empire, Kaabu became an independent kingdom.
 Aro Confederacy (1690–1902), a trading union orchestrated by the Igbo subgroup, the Aro people, centered in Arochukwu in present-day Southeastern Nigeria.
 Bonoman (11th century–19th century), earliest known Akan state. Gold trading and Kola nut trading with Northern Neighbors brought wealth and prosperity to Akan creators of this state. Culture influenced much of modern Akan culture.
 Gbokpoe Dynasty was founded in 1700. This dynasty ruled Djanglanmey, Grand-popo. In the region this  clan  was the famous slave trader.
 The Kingdom of Wémè was founded during the height of the slave trade in the late 17th century. Nowadays it is centred in modern-day Benin, ruled by its own traditional legitimate monarch in the Ouémé Valley.
 Ashanti Empire (1701–1894), a pre-colonial Akan West African state of what is now the Ashanti Region in Ghana. The empire stretched from central Ghana to present day Togo and Côte d'Ivoire, bordered by the Dagomba kingdom to the north and Dahomey to the east. Today, the Ashanti monarchy continues as one of the constitutionally protected, sub-national traditional states within the Republic of Ghana.
 Various states by Akan people (11th century–19th century)
 Kong Empire (1710–1898)  centered in north eastern Côte d'Ivoire that also encompassed much of present-day Burkina Faso.
 Bamana Empire (1712–1896), based at Ségou, now in Mali. It was ruled by the Kulubali or Coulibaly dynasty established c. 1640 by Fa Sine also known as Biton-si-u. The empire existed as a centralized state from 1712 to the 1861 invasion of Toucouleur conqueror El Hadj Umar Tall.
 Sokoto Caliphate (1804–1903), an Islamic empire in Nigeria, led by the Sultan of Sokoto, Sa'adu Abubakar. Founded during the Fulani Jihad in the early 19th century, it was one of the most powerful empires in sub-Saharan Africa prior to European conquest and colonization. The caliphate remained extant through the colonial period and afterwards, though with reduced power.
 Wassoulou Empire (1878–1898), a short-lived empire built from the conquests of Dyula ruler Samori Ture and destroyed by the French colonial army.
Akwa Akpa Duke Town, originally known as Atakpa is an Efik city-state that flourished in the 19th century in what is now southern Nigeria. The City State extended from now Calabar to Bakassi in the east and Oron to the west.
 Ife Empire (1200 - 1420) The Ife Empire was the first empire in Yoruba history. It was founded in what is now southwestern Nigeria and eastern Benin today. The Ife Empire lasted from 1200 to 1420. Its capital city, Ilé-Ife, was one of the largest urban centers, the biggest emporium, and the wealthiest polity south of the Niger River during the mid-14th-century.

Central Africa

 The Kongo Kingdom (1400–1888) was a quasi-imperial state as is evident by the number of people and kingdoms that paid it tribute. If not for the large amount of text written by the EssiKongo that repeatedly called themselves a kingdom, they would be listed as the "Kongo Empire".
 The Luba Empire (1585–1885) arose in the marshy grasslands of the Upemba Depression in what is now southern Democratic Republic of Congo.
 Lunda Empire (1660–1887) in what is now the Democratic Republic of Congo, north-eastern Angola and northwestern Zambia. Its central state was in Katanga.
 Central African Empire (1976–79) was a short-lived and self-stylised 'Imperial' one-party state ruled by an absolute monarch that replaced the Central African Republic and was, in turn, replaced by the restoration of the Republic.

Southern Africa

The Mutapa Empire or Empire of Great Zimbabwe (1450–1629) was a medieval kingdom located between the Zambezi and Limpopo rivers of Southern Africa in the modern states of Zimbabwe and Mozambique. Remnants of the historical capital are found in the ruins of Great Zimbabwe.

 Zulu Kingdom
 Maravi Empire or Marawi or Merowi or Merowe/ Meroe Empire. Not to be confused with Ancient Meroe.
 Kingdom of Mapungubwe
 Rozvi Empire
 Xhosa Kingdom

East Africa

 The Empire of Kitara in the area of the African Great Lakes has long been treated as a historical entity
 The Buganda Kingdom (1500–present), home of the Buganda people of Uganda
 The medieval Swahili city-states
 The Wanga Kingdom, home of the Wanga (AbaWanga) tribe of the Luhya people. The largest empire in precolonial Kenya

Horn of Africa

 Ancient land of Punt (2500 BC)
 Ancient Barbara/Barbaroi cities and states mentioned in the  Periplus of the Erythraean Sea (1st century).
 Opone/Xāfūn (1000 BC – 5th century AD)
 Mundus/Xīs
 Mosylon/Bōsāso 
 Malao/Berbera
 Nikon/Būr Gābo 
 Sarapion/Muqdisho
 Kingdom of Aksum (1st century – 9th century)
 Kingdom of Bazin (9th century)
 Kingdom of Belgin (9th century)
 Kingdom of Jarin (9th century)
 Kingdom of Qita'a (9th century)
 Kingdom of Nagash (9th century)
 Kingdom of Tankish (9th century)
 Sultanate of Mogadishu (10th century – 16th century)
 Ethiopian Empire (1137–1974)
 Zagwe dynasty (1137–1270)
 Solomonic dynasty (1270–1974)
 Sultanate of Ifat (1285–1415)
 Isaaq Sultanate (17th century –1884)
 Ajuran Sultanate (1300s–1700s)
 Adal Sultanate (1415–1555)
 Sultanate of Harar (1526–1577)
 Emirate of Harar (1647–1887)
 Sultanate of the Geledi (late 17th century – late 19th century)
 Majeerteen Sultanate (mid-18th century – early 20th century)
 Sultanate of Aussa (1734–present)
 Kingdom of Gomma (early 1800s–1886)
 Kingdom of Jimma (1830–1932)
 Kingdom of Gumma (1840–1902)
 Sultanate of Hobyo (1880s–1920s)
 Dervish state (1896–1920)

North Africa

Ancient North African empires 

Pre-Islamic empires of North Africa:

 Kingdom of Kerma (2500–1500 BC)
 Ancient Egypt (3100–650 BC)
 Kingdom of Kush (1070 BC–350 AD)
 Nobatia (350–650 AD)
 Makuria (340–1312 AD)
 Alodia (??? AD–1504 AD)
 Ancient Carthage (575–146 BC)
 Kingdom of Numidia (202 BC–40 BC)

Islamic North African empires
 In Algeria:
 Rustamid dynasty (776-909)
 Banu Ifran dynasty (830–1040)
 Zirid dynasty (947–1090)
 Fatimid dynasty (909 1171)
 Hammadid dynasty (1014–1152)
 Kingdom of Tlemcen (1235 – 1554)
 Kingdom of Ait Abbas (1510 - 1872)
 Kingdom of Kuku (1515 – 1638)
 Ottoman Algeria (1515–1830)
 In Morocco:
 Idrisid dynasty (789–974)
 Almoravid dynasty (1061–1145)
 Almohad dynasty (1145–1244)
 Marinid dynasty (1244–1465)
 Wattasid dynasty (1471–1554)
 Saadi dynasty (1554-1666)
 Alaouite dynasty (1666–present)
 In Tunisia:
 Aghlabid dynasty (800-909)
 Fatimid dynasty (Tunisian period) (921–969)
 Zirid dynasty (973–1148)
 Hafsid dynasty (1229–1574)
 Husainid dynasty (1705-1881)
 In Egypt:
 Tulunid dynasty (868–905)
 Ikhshidid dynasty (935–969)
 Fatimid dynasty (Egyptian period) (969–1171)
 Ayyubid dynasty (1171–1254)
 Mamluk dynasty (1250–1517)
 In Sudan:
 The Sennar Sultanate (1502–1821) was a sultanate in the north of Sudan. It was named Funj after the ethnic group of its dynasty or Sinnar (or Sennar) after its capital, which ruled a substantial area of the Sudan region.

Comparison
Vansina (1962) discusses the classification of Sub-Saharan African kingdoms, mostly of Central, South and East Africa, with some additional data on West African (Sahelian) kingdoms distinguishing five types, by decreasing centralization of power:

 Despotic kingdoms: Kingdoms where the king controls the internal and external affairs directly. Examples are Ruanda, Nkore, Soga and Kongo in the 16th century
 Regal kingdoms: Kingdoms where the king controls the external affairs directly, and the internal affairs via a system of overseers. The king and his chiefs belong to the same clans or lineages.
 Incorporative kingdoms: Kingdoms where the king controls only the external affairs with no permanent administrative links between him and the chiefs of the provinces. The hereditary chiefdoms of the provinces were left undisturbed after conquest. Examples are the Bamileke, Lunda, Luba, Lozi.
 Aristocratic kingdoms: The only link between central authority and the provinces is payment of tribute. These kingdoms are morphologically intermediate between regal kingdoms and federations. This type is rather common in Africa, examples including the Kongo of the 17th century, the Cazembe, Luapula, Kuba, Ngonde, Mlanje, Ha, Zinza and Chagga states of the 18th century
 Federations: Kingdoms (such as the Ashanti Union) where the external affairs are regulated by a council of elders headed by the king, who is simply primus inter pares.

See also
History of Africa
Classical African civilizations

References

Sources
 
 Vansina, J. "A Comparison of African Kingdoms", Africa: Journal of the International African Institute (1962), pp. 324–335.
 Turchin, Peter and Jonathan M. Adams and Thomas D. Hall: "East-West Orientation of Historical Empires and Modern States", Journal of World-Systems Research, Vol. XII, No. II, 2006

Further reading

External links
 African Kingdoms
 Haffenreffer Museum of Anthropology at Brown University

 

Empires
Pan-Africanism